Manapla, officially the Municipality of Manapla,  is a 2nd class municipality in the province of Negros Occidental, Philippines. According to the 2020 census, it has a population of 55,083 people.

The town is notable for its signature delicacy puto.

Geography

Barangays
Manapla is politically subdivided into 12 barangays.
 Chambéry
 Barangay I (Poblacion)
 Barangay I-A (Poblacion)
 Barangay I-B (Poblacion)
 Barangay II (Poblacion)
 Barangay II-A (Poblacion)
 Punta Mesa
 Punta Salong
 Purisima
 San Pablo
 Santa Teresa
 Tortosa

Climate

Demographics

Economy

References

External links
 
 [ Philippine Standard Geographic Code]
Philippine Census Information
Local Governance Performance Management System

Municipalities of Negros Occidental